The Sacketts Brook Stone Arch Bridge, also known locally as the Hi-Lo Biddy Stone Arch Bridge, is a historic bridge just outside the village of Putney, Vermont. It was built in 1906 by James Otis Follett, an area stonemason, and is one of a few surviving examples of his work. The bridge was listed on the National Register of Historic Places in 1976.

Description and history
The Sacketts Brook Stone Arch Bridge spans Sacketts Brook in a wooded ravine a short way east of the center of Putney village. The road it formerly carried (now truncated at each end) is designated Mill Street on the west side and Hi-Lo Biddy Road on the east side of the brook. The arch is formed out of mortared granite blocks, with a slightly projecting keystone at the top of the arch. The stones are laid in a mostly regular pattern, and the bridge spandrels are filled in with more irregularly-laid stone. Three layers of stone are laid on top of the arch, above which is the gravel roadbed. The bridge abutments and adjoining wing walls are of irregularly coursed rubblestone laid without mortar.

The bridge was built in 1906 by James Otis Follett, a mason from nearby Townshend.  Follett is documented to have built more than 40 bridges and culverts, all at a time when stone bridges were falling out of fashion, supplanted by ironwork bridges.  Of these works, this bridge was one of eleven documented to survive at the time of its listing on the National Register in 1976.  The bridge was closed to vehicular traffic in 1996, and its abutments and wing walls were described as threatened by erosion in a 2000 report.

See also
National Register of Historic Places listings in Windham County, Vermont
List of bridges on the National Register of Historic Places in Vermont

References

Road bridges on the National Register of Historic Places in Vermont
Bridges completed in 1906
Bridges in Windham County, Vermont
Buildings and structures in Putney, Vermont
National Register of Historic Places in Windham County, Vermont
Stone arch bridges in the United States
1906 establishments in Vermont